Kuzhimanna Gramapanchayat is a Gramapanchayat located in Areecode Block Panchayat in Kondotty Taluk, The area of Kuzhimanna Gramapanchayat is 20.05 square kilometer. There is 18 wards in this panchayat. This panchayat was formed in 1961. Kizhissery is a town near Kondotty in Malappuram district in the state of Kerala, India.

Location
The town of Kizhisseri is located in the middle of the main road from Kondotty to Areacode.  Kuzhimanna is the formal name of the village.

Demographics
 India census, Kuzhimanna had a population of 28818 with 14240 males and 14578 females.

Suburbs and Villages
 Kaloth Hills
 Onnam Mile
 Ekkaparamba
 Valappan Kundu
 Alinchuvadu
 Balathil Puraya
 Neeruttikkal
 Munduparamba Hills
 Kanchiramoochy Hills
 Hajiyapadi
 Muthuvalloor
 Kadungalloor
 Velleri
 Chemrakkattoor
 Pookkattuchola
 Alattippara
 Kozhakkottoor
 Kannarath
 Chullikkode

Important Landmarks
 Alabeer Hospital, Kizhisseri
 Bukhari Madrassa, Kaloth
 Sabihul Hudha Madrassa, Onnam Mile
 Irshadu SAbyan Masjidh, Ekkaparamba
 Markkasussalam Madrassa, Ekkaparamba
 Hidayath Madrassa, Valappan Kundu
 Ganapath School, Kizhisseri
 Ragam Cinema, Kizhisseri
 Chinese Chantha, Kizhisseri
 Nellikkunnu Harijan Colony
 Harithagiri Regional College
 Old metal bridge, Kadungalloor
 Shankara Narayana Temple, Kadungalloor
 MMH Melmury 
 Friends Arts and Sports Club
 Kizhisseri Development Society, KDS
 Kuzhimanna Youth Club, KYC
 Badar Masjid
 Manshaussaada Madrassa
 Gov:Higher Secondary School Kuzhimanna
 Gov:Higher Secondary School Chullikkode
 Al Ansar Orphanage
 Izzath Izlamic Complex
 Secure steel doors and windows, Cheruparambu
 Melepurakkal Hospital, Kadungallur
 Govt.UP School, Kadungallur
 Kadungallur Youth Cultural Club (KYCC)

Transportation
Kuzhimanna village connects to other parts of India through Feroke town on the west and Nilambur town on the east.  National highway No.66 passes through Pulikkal and the northern stretch connects to Goa and Mumbai.  The southern stretch connects to Cochin and Trivandrum.  State Highway No.28 starts from Nilambur and connects to Ooty, Mysore and Bangalore through Highways.12,29 and 181. The nearest airport is at Kozhikode.  The nearest major railway station is at Feroke.

References

Villages in Malappuram district
Kondotty area